Eben-Ezer Tower, also known as the Museum of Flint (French:Musée du Silex), is a tower and museum in Eben-Emael, in the municipality of Bassenge in eastern Belgium.

Constructed by one man, Robert Garcet (1912-2001), between 1948 and 1963, the tower is a fantastical construction built of flint rubble, and with dimensions and symbolism taken from the bible and from ancient civilisations.

The tower is conspicuously topped at its four corners by large stone sculptures of the four cherubim of the Apocalypse: a bull on the north-west turret, man, in the form of a sphinx in the south-west, a lion in the south-east and an eagle at the north-east corner.

Some of the seven floors of the tower are open to the public. The first few levels, the 'museum of flint', explain the history and use of the stone.

As a work of outsider architecture, the tower was featured in episode 3 of Jarvis Cocker's 1999 series, Journeys into The Outside. Cocker visited the tower and interviewed Robert Garcet.

References

External links
 

Museums in Liège Province
Bassenge
Towers in Belgium